Wonder Mtolo (born 18 October 2000) is a South African cricketer. He made his List A debut on 1 March 2021, for KwaZulu-Natal in the 2020–21 CSA Provincial One-Day Challenge.

References

External links
 

2000 births
Living people
South African cricketers
KwaZulu-Natal cricketers
Place of birth missing (living people)